Danielle Jade Brogan (born 28 June 1988) is an Australian former soccer player who played in Australia and England. She played in Australia for Sydney FC, Adelaide United FC and Perth Glory in the Australian W-League. In England, Brogan played nine times for Notts County. At international level she represented Australia at both under-age and full international level. Brogan played seven times for Australia between 2009 and 2015.

Playing career

Club career

NSW Sapphires
Brogan played 12 times for the New South Wales Sapphires in the Women's National Soccer League.

Notts County
Brogan signed for Notts County in the Women's Super League early in the 2014 season.

Perth Glory
In 2015, Brogan signed for Perth Glory.

After 18 months not playing, Brogan returned to soccer, signing again with Perth Glory.

International career
Brogan represented Australia at the 2004 FIFA World Under 19 Women's Championship in Thailand and at the 2006 edition in Russia.

Brogan played her first match for Australia in 2009, in a match against Italy in Sydney. Overall, she played seven times for Australia, with her last match being in 2015.

Honours

Club
NSW Sapphires:
 Women's National Soccer League Championship: 2003

Sydney FC:
 W-League Premiership: 2009, 2010–11
 W-League Championship: 2009

References

External links
 
 

1988 births
Living people
Australian women's soccer players
Sydney FC (A-League Women) players
Notts County L.F.C. players
Adelaide United FC (A-League Women) players
Perth Glory FC (A-League Women) players
Women's Super League players
Women's association football defenders
Australian expatriate sportspeople in England
Expatriate women's footballers in England